Buliisa District is a district in Western Uganda. As with most Ugandan districts, Buliisa District is named after its "main town" Buliisa, where the district headquarters are located.
Bugungu has 6 sub counties Kigwera, Ngwedo, Buliisa, Butiaba, Kihungya, and Biiso and 3 town councils (Buliisa, Butiaba and Biiso).

Location
Buliisa District is bordered by Pakwach District to the northwest, Nwoya District to the northeast, Masindi District to the east, Hoima District to the south and the Democratic Republic of the Congo, across Lake Albert, to the west.

Overview
Buliisa District was created in 2006 by the Ugandan Parliament. Prior to that, Buliisa District was part of Masindi District. The district is primarily rural and most people in the district are either pastoralists, fisherpeople or subsistence agriculturalists. The district is part of Bunyoro sub-region, which is coterminous with Bunyoro Kingdom. As of October 2020, the districts that comprise Bunyoro Kingdom include: 1. Buliisa District 2. Masindi District 3. Kiryandongo District 4. Hoima District 5. Kikuube District 6. Kakumiro District 7. Kibaale District and 8. Kagadi District.

Population
The 1991 national population census enumerated the population of the district at 47,709. In 2002, the national census conducted that year enumerated the district population at 63,363. On 27 August 2014, the national population census and household survey enumerated the population of Buliisa District at 113,161. In July 2020, the Uganda Bureau of Statistics (UBOS) estimated the mid-year population of the district at 149,300 people. Of these, approximately 78,300 (52.4 percent) were males and approximately 71,000 (47.6 percent) were females. UBOS estimates that the district population grew at an average annual rate of 4.86 percent, between 2014 and 2020.

During the first 20 years of the 2000s, a considerable amount of crude oil deposits have been discovered in the district. The Ugandan Government is in the final stages of preparing to start extracting the oil discovered in Buliisa and the neighboring districts.
the main central processing unit is located in Kasinyi ngwedo sub-county, this point will collect all the oil from Murchison falls national park barrels before forwarding it to Kaiso.

Polish Refugee Camp 
A Polish refugee camp was established in the area of Nyabyeya (now part of the Nyabyeya Forestry College in the southern part of Buliisa District) as part of the Evacuation of Polish civilians from the USSR in World War II. The refugee camp existed from 1939 to 1948. The Our Lady Queen of Poland Catholic Church and it's graveyard are maintained to this day.

The Tribes in Buliisa
The prominent chief clan of Alur who migrated from Jagi in early 1921 grave yard was discovered in Ngwedo sub county bulisa district and believed that this might have made the greater migration of Alur settlement around Kabalega National park. Chonga was a great hunter who settled in Ngwedo sub county and the grave yard was discovered. they used to cross the lake Albert via Chogo Liech which is commonly located between Kisiabi and Kabolwa at chwa 11.The migration of Chonga had opened the Alur migration from Eastern DRC, and west nile into the district. |colwidth=15em|
Alur
((Bagungu))
Bunyoro
Western Uganda
Uganda Districts

References

External links
Official Website

 
Bunyoro sub-region
Districts of Uganda
Western Region, Uganda
Lake Albert (Africa)